Uncinula macrospora is a plant pathogen that causes a powdery mildew disease of certain North American trees. Its hosts include various elms (Ulmus spp.), hackberries (Celtis spp.), and American hop hornbeam Ostrya virginiana.

References

External links 
 Index Fungorum
 USDA ARS Fungal Database

Fungal tree pathogens and diseases
Erysiphales
Fungi described in 1872
Taxa named by Charles Horton Peck